Lick Fork is a stream in Boone and Randolph County in the U.S. state of Missouri. It is a tributary of Perche Creek.

Lick Fork was named for the mineral licks in the area.

See also
List of rivers of Missouri

References

Rivers of Boone County, Missouri
Rivers of Randolph County, Missouri
Rivers of Missouri